Marquess of Santa Cruz was a noble title in two countries and Marquise of Santa Cruz in one.

Brazil

Romualdo Antônio de Seixas (1787–1860) was the first and only Count and Marquess of Santa Cruz.

Portugal
The feminized title was created by John V of Portugal by decree in 1691 for Teresa de Moscoso Osório

Spain
Spanish variations include:
 Marquess of Santa Cruz.
 Marquess of Santa Cruz de Aguirre.
 Marquess of Santa Cruz de Marcenado.
 Marquess of Santa Cruz de Ribaduya.
 Marquess of Santa Cruz del Viso.

See also
 Count of Santa Cruz
 Duke of Santa Cruz

Marquesses of Santa Cruz